Kenosha Regional Airport  is a city-owned public-use airport located four nautical miles (7 km) west of the central business district of Kenosha, a city in Kenosha County, Wisconsin, United States.

The airport is an air-traffic-controlled general aviation facility with no scheduled passenger service.

It is included in the Federal Aviation Administration (FAA) National Plan of Integrated Airport Systems for 2023–2027, in which it is categorized as a national reliever airport facility.

Facilities and aircraft 
It has three runways: 7L/25R is 6,600 by 100 feet (2,012 x 30 m) with a concrete surface; 15/33 is 4,440 by 100 feet (1,353 x 30 m) with a concrete surface; 7R/25L is 3,302 by 75 feet (1,006 x 23 m) with an asphalt/concrete surface.

For the 12-month period ending December 31, 2021, the airport had 59,998 aircraft operations, an average of 164 per day: 93% general aviation, 7% air taxi and less than 1% military.

In January 2023, there were 223 aircraft based at this airport: 173 single-engine, 20 multi-engine, 17 jet, 12 helicopter and 1 glider.

See also 
 List of airports in Wisconsin

References

External links 
 Kenosha Regional Airport page at City of Kenosha website
  page from the Wisconsin DOT Airport Directory
 
 

Airports in the Chicago metropolitan area
Airports in Wisconsin
Buildings and structures in Kenosha County, Wisconsin